is a Japanese comedy film directed by Shinobu Yaguchi about pilots and flight attendants. All Nippon Airways (ANA) backed the creation of the film. The airline sponsored a giveaway of Happy Flight DVDs and other items to certain members of ANA's mileage club.

Plot
Kazuhiro Suzuki, a copilot who is trying to qualify as a Captain, and Etsuko Saitō, a young flight attendant going on her first international flight, service an All Nippon Airways 747-400 as Flight 1980 from Haneda Airport to Honolulu International Airport. Suzuki feels stressed when Captain Noriyoshi Harada becomes his evaluator, while Saitō under Chief Purser Reiko Yamazaki. The 747 has been reported with malfunctioning heated pitot tubes, but Noriyoshi decides to postpone repair to avoid delays, relying on redundant instruments. Immediately after takeoff, which involved bird patrol to fend off surrounding pigeons, an alarm prompts Noriyoshi to switch to the backup pitot tube as their primary indication.

Inflight services commence shortly after. Due to the overbooked flight, not all passengers could receive their first choice of lunch between beef and fish; Reiko gives Saitō a lesson in dealing with demand imbalance: promoting the less wanted fish. She follows through with her first mishap, describing the beef as "plain and ordinary." She then fumbles orders for white wine, apple juice, and motion sickness drugs. She corrects the drink orders, but the ill passenger vomits onto her uniform.

Meanwhile, the plane behaves erratically under Noriyoshi's command. Kazuhiro responds to passenger Ground staff confirms that the 747 suffered a bird strike; the engines ingested a bird without failing, but the bird also disabled the remaining pitot tubes, freezing the plane at cruising altitude. The aircraft has lost all indication of airspeed until they descend to below 22,000 feet, where air temperature is above freezing point. The captain elects to return to Haneda, now suffering from severe weather conditions. The flight crew and ground controllers then have to work together to land the plane, win the cooperation of the ill passenger, and determine if the maintenance crew was at fault for the aircraft's failure.

Cast
 Haruka Ayase
 Tomoko Tabata
 Seiichi Tanabe
 Shinobu Terajima
 Saburō Tokitō
 Kazue Fukiishi
 Ittoku Kishibe

Reception
Mark Schilling of The Japan Times reviewed the film, giving it three of five stars. Schilling said that he "felt somewhat like a convict watching a prison film whose heroes are the trustees and guards — and feeling the filmmakers aren't getting the whole story."

References

External links
 Happy Flight official website 
 

2008 films
Films directed by Shinobu Yaguchi
All Nippon Airways
Japanese aviation films
Films set on airplanes
2000s Japanese films